Richard Graham Sarstedt (born 29 March 1940), known by the stage name Eden Kane, is an English pop/rock singer, musician, record producer and actor best known as a teen idol in the early 1960s, in the pre-Beatles era. He has also recorded under his birth name and with backing group the Downbeats. 

Born in British India, he is the elder brother of singer-songwriter Peter Sarstedt and singer Clive Sarstedt, with whom he collaborated on numerous Sarstedt Brothers albums. He had success in the early 1960s as a pop star appealing to a teenage audience, in the pre-Beatles era with hits including the co-written "Well I Ask You" which was a UK No. 1 hit in 1961, he then spent time in Australia before moving to the United States, where he began an acting career.

Life and career
He was born in New Delhi, British India, where his parents Albert James and Coral (nee Bryrne) were civil servant and classical musicians. When Richard was a child, the family—including his two younger brothers Peter and Clive, and their three sisters—moved to Kurseong, near Darjeeling, to run a tea plantation. He pursued his schooling from Sherwood College till March 1954, when, after his father's death, he moved with his brothers, sisters and mother to the UK. They settled in Norbury, Croydon, where Richard attended Heath Clark Grammar School. Inspired by Bill Haley, he learned guitar and formed a skiffle group, the Fabulous 5, which included his younger brothers.

He entered a talent contest at the Classic Cinema in Kings Road, Chelsea, where he won a contract to sing an advertising jingle for Cadbury's Drinking Chocolate, which was played frequently on Radio Luxembourg. He was signed by management team Philip Waddilove and Michael Barclay, who changed Sarstedt's name to Eden Kane – "Eden" because of its biblical associations at a time when Adam Faith was a top pop star, and "Kane" because Citizen Kane was Barclay's favourite film – and the song was released as the B-side of a single, "You Make Love So Well", by Pye Records in August 1960.

He then won a recording contract with Decca Records. His first recording for the label, "Well I Ask You"—written by Les Vandyke, arranged by John Keating, and produced by Bunny Lewis—reached No. 1 on the UK Singles Chart in August 1961. It was followed by three more top ten hits in the UK over the next year, "Get Lost" (No. 10), "Forget Me Not" (No. 3) and "I Don't Know Why" (No. 7). Together with a backing band, the Downbeats, which comprised Roger Retting, Ben Steed, Roger St. Clair and Bugs Waddell, he toured widely around the UK with stars as Cliff Richard, Billy Fury and Helen Shapiro. His brother Peter was the band's road manager, later joining on bass, with brother Clive joining on guitar.

His fifth single for Decca, "House to Let", failed to chart, and later releases for the label were equally unsuccessful. He left Decca and joined Philips subsidiary Fontana in 1963. Like many of his teen idol peers, Kane sought to stave off chart oblivion by hitching a ride onto the beat boom bandwagon, but some momentum was lost when his next release, originally titled "Do You Love Me" (c/w "Comeback"), had to be reissued with a new title, "Like I Love You", to avoid confusion with the UK hit covers of the Contours' US hit of the same name by Brian Poole & the Tremeloes and the Dave Clark Five. His third single for Fontana, "Boys Cry" (No. 8), returned him to the charts in January 1964, but it was to be his last hit. He made several television appearances on shows with newly-successful groups such as the Beatles and the Rolling Stones, and toured Australia with Roy Orbison, Del Shannon and the Searchers. Success in Australia led to him hosting a TV series in that country. At a stopover in Los Angeles he met American journalist Charlene Groman, sister of Stefanie Powers, and they married several years later.

After his chart success in Britain dried up, Kane moved to live in California, working as a record producer. His brothers, Peter and Clive, both achieved chart success in the UK (the former in the late 1960s and the latter, billed as "Robin" Sarstedt, in the 1970s), and, in 1972, the three brothers recorded an album as the Sarstedt Brothers, Worlds Apart Together. On 20 June 1973, the brothers made their first joint appearance as a group, at Fairfield Halls in Croydon.
Eden, Peter and Robin went on to win a joint BASCA Award for composing and songwriting.

Kane has since recorded for Bell, Monarch, HMV and Festival (the last two being Australian releases). He has also occasionally joined "oldies" tours in the UK with Marty Wilde, John Leyton, Brian Hyland and others, notably as part of the "Solid Gold Rock and Roll" package. He was a contract actor on the Star Trek team, and made several appearances in the TV series Star Trek: The Next Generation, Star Trek: Deep Space Nine and Star Trek: Voyager, under his real name Richard Sarstedt.

, he has a CD, entitled Y2Kane, available on his website. He continues to live in Los Angeles with his wife, the journalist Charlene Groman, and their family.

In 2017, Kane went on a UK tour with The Solid Gold Rock'n'Roll Show, which also featured Marty Wilde, Mark Wynter and Mike Berry.

Discography

Albums

Studio albums 

 Eden Kane (Ace of Clubs, 1962)
 It's Eden (Fontana, 1964)
 Another Day Passes By (Evolution, 1971) (as Richard Sarstedt)
 Y2Kane (Eden Kane CD, 1999)
 Eden Rock (Eden Kane CD, 2001)
 Signs of Love (2012)
 Fifty Three (2014)

Compilation albums 

 Well I Ask You (Deram, 1995)
 All the Hits Plus More...The Best of Eden Kane (Prestige, 1996)
 Very Best Of (Pegasus, 1997)
 Boys Cry (Pegasus, 2004)
 Well I Ask You – The Complete 60s Recordings (RPM, 2017)

Singles

See also
List of artists under the Decca Records label
List of artists who reached number one on the UK Singles Chart
List of performers on Top of the Pops

Notes

References

External links

45-RPM website – Eden Kane musical biography
California Ballroom – Eden Kane Management info and biography
[ Allmusic.com biography]

1940 births
Living people
English male singers
English pop singers
English male television actors
People from Delhi
Indian emigrants to the United Kingdom
English expatriates in the United States
People from Croydon
Decca Records artists